Maud Florance Gatewood (January 8, 1934 – November 8, 2004) was an American artist from Yanceyville, North Carolina. She is regarded as one of the finest painters in North Carolina history by art historians, museum directors, curators, and collectors.

Biography

Early life and career 

Maud Gatewood grew up in Yanceyville and attended Bartlett Yancey High School. When she was sixteen she enrolled at the Woman’s College of the University of North Carolina, which is presently the University of North Carolina at Greensboro. Finishing her undergraduate coursework in 1954, Gatewood continued her art studies at Ohio State University where she received a Master of Fine Arts degree.

In 1963, Gatewood won a Fulbright grant to study art in Austria under renowned painter Oskar Kokoschka. Returning to North Carolina, she began teaching art at the University of North Carolina at Charlotte. She later left her position at the school in 1973, desiring more time to paint.

During her lifetime, Gatewood had a strong following, particularly in the southeastern United States. Her work has been exhibited in private collections and museums throughout the U.S., including the National Museum of Women in the Arts in Washington, DC.

Gatewood won numerous awards during her artistic career, including an art award from the American Academy of Arts and Letters in 1972 and the North Carolina Award in Fine Arts in 1984.

References

External links
 Greensboro.com
 The Johnson Collection
 Artnet
 Danville Museum of Fine Arts & History

20th-century American painters
American women painters
People from Yanceyville, North Carolina
Painters from North Carolina
1934 births
2004 deaths
University of North Carolina at Charlotte faculty
20th-century American women artists
American women academics
21st-century American women